Quercus durifolia, commonly known as encino colorado, is a species of oak tree native to Mexico.

Description
Quercus durifolia is a small evergreen tree that typically reaches  in height, occasionally growing to 15 meters. Leaves are lanceolate or ovate, glossy and dark-green on the top and tomentose on the underside. The bark is dark gray to black, smooth when young and becoming rough and fissured with age.

Distribution and habitat 
It is native to the Sierra Madre Occidental, from northwestern Chihuahua to Aguascalientes and northern Jalisco, with a southeastern outlier in the mountains of Guanajuato.

It is generally found on gently sloping sites with deep soils, and can form pure stands on relatively flat sites with favorable soils. Other associated plants include Quercus arizonica,  Pinus cooperi, Arbutus xalapensis, Fraxinus gooddingii, and Juniperus deppeana.

Ecology 
The acorn woodpecker (Melanerpes formicivorus) disperses its acorns in northwestern Mexico.

References

Flora of the Sierra Madre Occidental
Endemic oaks of Mexico
duriflora